On October 24, 2018, the bodies of 16 year old Tala and 23 year old Rotana Farea were found along rocky banks of the Hudson River. The bodies were bound with duct tape and the NYPD concluded there was no foul play. Police determined that their deaths were part of a suicide pact. Both of the sisters were last seen by their family in Virginia on November 30, 2017. Before disappearing, the sisters lived in a "shelter-like" facility due to abuse allegations in their district. A witness claimed he saw the two sisters 30 feet apart with their heads in their hands and that they appeared to be praying.

The sisters had been missing from their home for several weeks.

The medical examiner ruled that the sisters killed themselves.

Connection to Saudi Arabia 
New York Police have sources that the sisters would "Rather kill themselves than return to Saudi Arabia". The sisters' mother told local media that the Saudi embassy in Washington had ordered the family to leave the U.S. But Saudi Arabia refuted that stating, "Reports that we ordered anyone related to the Saudi sisters, Tala and Rotana Farea, God rest their souls, (who recently died tragically in NY), to leave the US for seeking asylum; are absolutely false. Details are still under investigation and will be shared in due course.''''

See also
List of solved missing person cases

References 

2010s missing person cases
2018 in New York City
2018 suicides
Farea, Tala and Rotana
Formerly missing people
Farea, Tala and Rotana
Missing person cases in Virginia
October 2018 events in the United States
Sisters
Farea, Tala and Rotana
Women in New York City